Selwyn Gerald Maister  (born 24 May 1946) is a former New Zealand field hockey player, who was a member of the national team that won the golden medal at the 1976 Summer Olympics in Montreal.

Maister was awarded the Queen's Service Medal in the 2012 New Year Honours, for services to hockey.  Maister earned a DPhil in inorganic chemistry from Magdalen College, Oxford, as a Rhodes Scholar, arriving in 1969.

He is a brother of hockey player Barry Maister.

References

External links
 
 

1946 births
Living people
Field hockey players at the 1968 Summer Olympics
Field hockey players at the 1972 Summer Olympics
Field hockey players at the 1976 Summer Olympics
New Zealand field hockey coaches
New Zealand male field hockey players
Olympic field hockey players of New Zealand
Olympic gold medalists for New Zealand
Field hockey players from Christchurch
Olympic medalists in field hockey
Medalists at the 1976 Summer Olympics
Recipients of the Queen's Service Medal
New Zealand Rhodes Scholars
Alumni of Magdalen College, Oxford
20th-century New Zealand people
21st-century New Zealand people